Brian Philip Nash (born 20 May 1963) is an English singer, songwriter, musician, author and actor. He is best known as the lead guitarist and backing vocalist of the synth-pop band Frankie Goes to Hollywood.

Early life 
He attended secondary school at St Francis Xavier's College, Liverpool

Career 

Nash worked as an electrician when he formed the band Sons and Egypt with Peter Gill and Holly Johnson. In 1980, Gill and Johnson left the band to form Frankie Goes to Hollywood, and Nash joined them later.

Seven singles and two albums released by Frankie Goes To Hollywood reached the top 30 on the UK charts.

From 1987 to 1997, Nash worked as a guitarist and songwriter for various bands. In 1997, he began a solo career, releasing music as Nasher. In July 2009, he recorded a version of "You'll Never Walk Alone" at his father's funeral service.

In 2012, Nash published the biographical book: Nasher Says Relax, about his life in the band Frankie Goes to Hollywood.

In 2015, he worked as an actor (Docker) in the film Saturday by Mike Forshaw.

Nash declined to take part in a 2004 Frankie reunion, but later agreed to a reunion when VH1's show Bands Reunited approached him. The band reunited but did not perform together because Holly Johnson declined.

Discography 

 Ripe (1999)
 Le Grande Fromage (2003)
 A Lo Minimo (2010)
 432-1: Open The Vein (2017)

Filmography

Film

Bibliography

References

External links 

 
 
 

1963 births
20th-century British guitarists
20th-century British male musicians
21st-century British guitarists
21st-century British male musicians
English male guitarists
English male singer-songwriters
English pop guitarists
Living people
Musicians from Liverpool
Frankie Goes to Hollywood members